Peter Laughner (August 22, 1952 – June 22, 1977) was an American guitarist, songwriter and singer.

A native of Bay Village, Ohio, Laughner was described by Richie Unterberger as "probably the single biggest catalyst in the birth of Cleveland's alternative rock scene in the mid 1970s."

Music career
Laughner led a variety of groups. Among them were Mr. Charlie, Cinderella Backstreet, Peter & The Wolves, The Blue Drivers and Friction. However, his most enduring contributions were to Rocket From The Tombs and the early work of Pere Ubu. In addition to all this, he wrote for Creem magazine.

Laughner was a voracious rock fan and writer, and was heavily influenced by the writings of Lester Bangs. Like Bangs, Laughner admired Lou Reed, but also drew inspiration from folk and blues figures such as Robert Johnson and Woody Guthrie. Tom Verlaine was also one of Laughner's idols.<ref name="Bangs">Peter Laughner is dead, Psychotic Reactions and Carburetor Dung: The Work of a Legendary Critic, collected writings, Greil Marcus, ed. Anchor Press, 1988.</ref>

There have been suggestions that Laughner was briefly considered as a replacement for Richard Lloyd when he departed Television, a band he championed from their earliest days.  However, Richard Lloyd disputes this.

Death
Laughner had severe drug and alcohol abuse problems that ultimately led to his death by acute pancreatitis in 1977 at the age of 24. Lester Bangs wrote a eulogy for him, simply titled "Peter Laughner is Dead".

Rumors to the effect that Laughner was despondent, even suicidal, at the time of his death have been contradicted by Laughner's last known message, written and mailed to Cleveland singer Ruby Port on the evening prior to his death. This letter revealed his intent to move to a retreat in the Ohio countryside, where he could write new music as well as rest and regain his health.

Recordings
Laughner's only known entrance into a recording studio was for the Pere Ubu single sessions, though he left behind countless lo-fi live, rehearsal, and demo recordings.  In 1994, Tim/Kerr label released Take the Guitar Player for a Ride, a 15-track LP drawn from these tapes, later re-released as a CD. This compilation sold poorly and has since gone out of print.  Fans continue to circulate bootleg recordings and a Cleveland-based label, Handsome Productions, offers a comprehensive collection of his music on CD, officially endorsed by his estate.

On October 3, 1973, Pete Laughner appeared as the hour's musical guest on the weekly "Coffee Break Concert" series broadcast over WMMS in Cleveland live from their studios.  

In June 2019, the Smog Veil record label released a 5-disc Laughner box set (with tapes procured from Handsome Productions, Pere Ubu's David Thomas, Tim Wright, and others).

In addition to solo recordings, Laughner's live guitar and vocal work is available in the posthumous Rocket from the Tombs album The Day the Earth Met the Rocket from the Tombs.''

Further reading

References

1952 births
1977 deaths
Musicians from Cleveland
Deaths from pancreatitis
American rock guitarists
American male guitarists
Songwriters from Ohio
Protopunk musicians
Pere Ubu members
20th-century American singers
20th-century American guitarists
Guitarists from Ohio
Rocket from the Tombs members
20th-century American male singers